Straight is a surname. Notable people with the surname include:

 Beatrice Straight (1914–2001), American actress
 Dorothy Straight (born 1958), American writer
 Henry Harrison Straight (1846–1886), American geologist and professor
 Michael Whitney Straight (1916–2004), American magazine publisher and novelist
 Nina Auchincloss Straight (born 1935), American writer, journalist and socialite
 Susan Straight (born 1960), American writer
 Whitney Willard Straight (1912–1979), American-born British Grand Prix driver and aviator
 Willard Dickerman Straight (1880–1918), American investment banker

See also
George Strait (born 1952), American country music singer